Giovanni Battista de Luca (1614–1683) was an Italian jurist and Cardinal of the Roman Catholic Church.

Biography
De Luca was born at Venosa, Basilicata, in 1614 of humble parentage. He took up the study of law at Naples in 1635. After graduation, he practiced law as an advocate in Naples for five years. An attack of pulmonary tuberculosis caused him to return to his native place, where he took up the bishop's vicariate.

In 1645 De Luca went to Rome, where he soon won a high reputation for his legal ability and became one of Italy's pre-eminent advocates. As a close collaborator of the reform-minded pope Innocent XI, who acceded to the Holy See in 1676, he exerted influence over the organisation of the Roman Curia, but stirred up much enmity and jealousy among the conservative leaders of the Church, notably Innocent's secretary Agostino Favoriti.

This caused his influence to wane over time. At an advanced age he became a priest and was made first referendary Utriusque Signaturae, then auditor of the Sacred Palace by Innocent, who finally in 1681 raised De Luca to the cardinalate. He died at Rome, on 5 February 1683.

Works

De Luca's writings, which are eminently practical in character, are most important for proper understanding of the jurisprudence of the Roman Curia and especially of the Rota Romana in his time. They include his "Relatio Curiae Romanae" (Cologne, 1683), "Sacrae Rotae decisiones" (Lyons, 1700) and "Annotationes praticae ad S. Conciluim Tridentinum" (Cologne, 1684).

His complete works were published under the title "Theatrum veritatis et justitiae (19 volumes, 1669–77; 12 volumes, Cologne, 1689–99); a comprehensive legal encyclopedia that became one of the most significant authorities of the late ius commune and was reprinted regularly up until the middle of the 18th century. De Luca also advocated the use of the Italian language in scientific publications and authored numerous works in Italian providing a comprehensive picture of the legal and institutional framework of his time.

 Il Dottor volgare, Roma, 1673.
 Dello stile legale, Roma, 1674.
 Difesa della lingua italiana, Roma, 1675.
 Il cavaliere e la dama, Roma, 1675.
 Il vescovo pratico, Roma, 1675.
 Il religioso pratico, Roma, 1679.
 Il Principe cristiano pratico, Roma, 1680.
 Il cardinale della S.R. Chiesa pratico, Roma, 1680.
 
 Relatio Curiae Romanae, Cologne, 1683.
 Adnotationes practicae ad S. Concilium Tridentinum, Colonia, 1684.
 Theatrum veritatis et justitiae (19 sv., 1669–77; 12 sv.), Colonia, 1689–99.
 
 Sacrae Rotae decisiones, Lione, 1700.

References

 
 
 
 
 

1614 births
1683 deaths
People from Venosa
17th-century Italian cardinals
17th-century Italian jurists